Cucurbita maxima, one of at least five species of cultivated squash, is one of the most diverse domesticated species. This species originated in South America from the wild subspecies Cucurbita maxima subsp. andreana over 4,000 years ago. Cucurbita maxima, known for modern varieties as Hubbard, Delicious, Marblehead, Boston Marrow, and Turks Turban, originated in northern Argentina near the Andes or in certain Andean valleys. Secondary centers of diversity include India, Bangladesh, Myanmar, and the southern Appalachians.

Different squash types of this species were introduced into North America as early as the 16th century. By the American Revolution, the species was in cultivation by Native American tribes throughout the present-day United States. By the early 19th century, at least three varieties are known to have been commercially introduced in North America from seeds obtained from Native Americans.

Types

Subspecies andreana 

At one time considered a separate species, andreana has been placed by modern biosystematics as a subspecies of C. maxima. It is native to Argentina and Uruguay and is the ancestor of the domesticated forms. C. andreana fruits are smaller and not palatable. It hybridizes readily with individuals of other C. maxima subspecies. 

C. maxima subsp. andreana has notably different calcium levels than individuals of other C. maxima subspecies. C. andreana has yellow flowers and bright green striped fruit. Extrafloral nectaries are present in C. maxima but not necessarily in C. andreana.

It was first formally described by Charles Victor Naudin in 1896, in Revue Horticole.

Cultivars 

Arikara squash weighs from four to eleven pounds with a tear-drop or round shape with a mottled orange and green color pattern. It is used both for its eating qualities and as decoration. This variety traces its ancestry to the Arikara tribe of the Dakotas, among whom its cultivation predates white settlement.
Banana squash has an elongated shape, with light blue, pink, or orange skin and bright orange flesh.
Boston marrow is sweet, narrow at one end, and bulbous at the other.
Buttercup squash has a turban shape (a flattish top) and dark green skin, weighs three to five pounds, and features dense, yellow-orange flesh. Not to be confused with butternut squash.
Candy roaster squash is a landrace developed by the Cherokee people in the southern Appalachians. A United States Department of Agriculture accession in 1960 notes that Candy Roasters had been grown for more than 100 years as of that date. It is variable in size and shape with more than 40 distinct forms according to one authority. Candy roasters consistently feature fine-textured orange flesh, while varying in size (from 10 lbs to more than 250 lbs); shape (including round, cylindrical, teardrop, and blocky); and color (pink, tan, green,  blue, gray, and orange). An article in the 1925 Charlotte Observer newspaper of Charlotte, North Carolina provides an account of two candy roaster varieties at a Cherokee fair that were both of similar shape and size to a Catawba watermelon, one being colored like a citron melon and the other "pumpkin color".
Hubbard squash usually has a tear-drop shape and is often used as a replacement for pumpkins in cooking. According to one source, the name comes from Bela Hubbard, settler of Randolph Township, Ohio in the Connecticut Western Reserve. Other sources conclude that this variety came to Marblehead, Massachusetts via Captain Knott Martin where Elizabeth Hubbard brought it to the attention of her neighbor, a seed trader named James J. H. Gregory. Gregory subsequently introduced it to the market using Hubbard as the eponym. Gregory later bred and released the Blue Hubbard, a variety with bluish-gray skin. Another variety, the Golden Hubbard, has a bright orange skin. Gregory advertisements for Hubbard squash began by 1859. The Hubbard squash, including questions regarding the name, is the subject of a children's ditty, "Raising Hubbard Squash in Vermont".
Jarrahdale pumpkin is a pumpkin with gray skin that is nearly identical to Queensland Blue and Sweet Meat_(squash) varieties.
Kabocha is a Japanese variety with dark green skin and bright golden-orange flesh.
Lakota squash is an American variety.
Nanticoke squash was grown by the Nanticoke people of Delaware and Eastern Maryland. It is one of only a few surviving Native American winter squashes from the Eastern woodlands.
Turban squash, also known as "French turban" predates  1820 and is closely related to the buttercup squash.

Uses
Buttercup squash, a common cultivar, can be roasted, baked, and mashed into soups, among a variety of filler uses, much like pumpkin. It is extremely popular, especially as a soup, in Brazil, Colombia, and Africa.

The seed of C. maxima is used in treating parasites in animals.

Cultivation

Since this plant requires a fair amount of hot weather for best growth, it has not become very well established in northern Europe, the British Isles, or in similar areas with short or cool summers.

Many cultivars of Cucurbita maxima have been developed. Only long-vining plants are known in this species. As in C. pepo, plants exist with a "bush habit" that is particularly evident in young plants, but older plants grow in the wild-type vining manner.

Gallery

References

External links

Squashes and pumpkins
maxima